Platyceps gracilis, commonly known as the graceful racer or slender racer, is a species of snake endemic to India.

Description
See snake scales for terms used
Snout is obtuse; rostral nearly as deep as broad, just visible from above; suture between the internasals a little shorter than that between the prefrontals; frontal slightly longer than its distance from the end of the snout, nearly as long as the occipitals; loreal nearly as deep as long; one preocular, with a small subocular below 3 two postoculars ; temporals 2+2; 9 upper labials, fifth and sixth entering the eye; 4 or 5 lower labials in contact with the anterior chin-shields; posterior chin-shields as long as or longer than the anterior, separated anteriorly by two scales. Scales smooth, in 21 rows. Ventrals ungulate laterally, 213–228; anal divided; subcaudals 118–121. Yellowish above, with a series of large round brown spots edged with black, separated by narrow interspaces; these spots become more indistinct on the posterior part of the body; a black cross-band on the snout and three angular dark brown black-edged bands on the head, the anterior between the eye, the posterior extending on to the nape; lower parts yellowish, with an irregular series of black spots on each side. Total length 33 inches; tail 10.

Distribution
This species is endemic to India and has been recorded in Gujarat, Madhya Pradesh, Maharashtra, and Rajasthan.

Notes

References
Boulenger GA (1893). Catalogue of the Snakes in the British Museum (Natural History). Volume I., Containing the Families ... Colubridæ Aglyphæ, part. London: Trustees of the British Museum. (Taylor and Francis, printers). xiii + 448 pp. + Plates I-XXVIII. (Zamenis gracilis, p. 404).
Günther A (1862) "On new Species of Snakes in the Collection of the British Museum". Ann. Mag. Nat. Hist., Third Series 9: 124–132. (Zamenis gracilis, new species, pp. 125–126).
Schätti B, Wilson LD (1986). "Coluber Linnaeus. Holarctic racers". Catalogue of American Amphibians and Reptiles (399): 1–4.
Smith MA (1943). The Fauna of British India, Ceylon and Burma, Including the Whole of the Indo-Chinese Sub-region. Reptilia and Amphibia. Vol. III.—Serpentes. London: Secretary of State for India. (Taylor and Francis, printers). xii + 583 pp. (Coluber gracilis, new combination, pp. 171–172).

External links
Image of Coluber gracilis on Flickr

Platyceps
Reptiles described in 1862
Taxa named by Albert Günther
Snakes of Asia
Endemic fauna of India
Reptiles of India